Mount Phelan is a mostly ice-free mountain (2,000 m) located 5 nautical miles (9 km) southeast of Killer Nunatak in the south portion of Emlen Peaks, Usarp Mountains. Mapped by United States Geological Survey (USGS) from surveys and U.S. Navy air photos, 1960–63. Named by Advisory Committee on Antarctic Names (US-ACAN) for Michael J. Phelan, geomagnetist/seismologist at South Pole Station, 1962; a member of the Byrd Traverse, 1963–64.

Mountains of Victoria Land
Pennell Coast